François De Pauw (28 December 1926 – 21 February 2009) was a Belgian basketball player. He competed in the men's tournament at the 1948 Summer Olympics.

References

External links
 

1926 births
2009 deaths
Belgian men's basketball players
Olympic basketball players of Belgium
Basketball players at the 1948 Summer Olympics
People from Uccle
Sportspeople from Brussels